Events in the year 1912 in Spain.

Incumbents
Monarch: Alfonso XIII
President of the Government:
 until 12 November: José Canalejas
 12 November-14 November: Manuel García Prieto
 starting 14 November: Álvaro Figueroa Torres

Events
12 November - José Canalejas, Prime Minister, is murdered in Madrid by an anarchist.
27 November - Spanish Protectorate in Morocco: By a treaty with France, Spain is granted a Zone of influence in northern and southern Morocco. 
Founding of FC L'Escala
Founding of the Open de España golf tournament.

Births
3 January - Federico Borrell García, Republican and anarchist militiaman (died 1936)
12 October - Dionisio Ridruejo, poet and political activist (died 1975)

Deaths
19 May - Marcelino Menéndez y Pelayo, historian and critic (born 1856)

References

 
1910s in Spain
Years of the 20th century in Spain